Saya Yasmine Amores (born Asha Radjkoemar; 8 March 1965 – 4 August 2021) was a Surinamese-Dutch poet, writer, and painter.  She wrote under the pen name Cándani from 1982 to 2007.  She then used the name Saya Yasmine Amores, which she legally adopted in 2013.

Early life 
Asha Radjkoemar was born in the district of Suriname, located in the country of Suriname, on 8 March 1965.  In 1982, she took up the pen name "Cándani", meaning "Moonlight" in the Sarnami language.

Literary career 
Cándani's first book was published in 1990.  It was a poetry collection in Sarnami with Dutch translations entitled Ghunghru tut gail/De rinkelband is gebroken [The bangle is broken].

Cándani's next collections were in Dutch, including Vanwaar je dacht te vertrekken sta je geplant (1993) and Een zoetwaterlied (2000).  She returned to Sarnami/Dutch bilingual poetry with Ghar ghar ke khel/Het spel van huisje huisje (2002).  These collections are centered around memories of Indo-Surinamese rural life.

She also wrote two novels, Oude onbekenden (2001) and Huis van as (2002), in which the search for the Indo-Surinamese identity is placed within the historical context of Hindustani migration to Suriname and re-migration to the Netherlands. 

Geef mij het land dat in jou woont (2004) is a collection of poems about the history of Suriname.

Personal life and death 
Cándani married Dennis van den Bosch in 1999, publishing a commemorative collection Zal ik terugkeren als je bruid [I will come as your bride].  She had one daughter from a prior relationship in Suriname.

She was hospitalised in 2020 at the Antoni van Leeuwenhoekziekenhuis.  She died of cancer on 4 August 2021 in Amsterdam.

Further reading 

 Michel Szulc-Krzyzanowski (photography) & Michiel van Kempen (text), Woorden op de westenwind; Surinaamse schrijvers buiten hun land van herkomst. Amsterdam: In de Knipscheer, 1994, pp. 220-241.
 Michiel van Kempen, "De moeizame geboorte van een Sarnami dichteres - of niet?" In: Literatuur, 17 (2000), no. 4, July/August, pp. 211-216.
 Michiel van Kempen, Een geschiedenis van de Surinaamse literatuur. Breda: De Geus, 2003, Vol II, pp. 1170-1177.

References

External links
 Cándani at the Digital Library for Dutch Literature (in Dutch)
 

1965 births
2021 deaths
Surinamese women poets
Surinamese novelists
Deaths from cancer in the Netherlands